Žegar may refer to:

 Žegar, Šentjur, a village in Slovenia
 Žegar, Bukovica, a historical settlement in Bukovica, Croatia